These are the official results of the men's team pursuit at the 1968 Summer Olympics in Mexico City, Mexico, held on 19 to 21 October 1968. There were 85 participants from 20 nations.

Competition format

The team pursuit competition consisted of a qualifying round and a 3-round knockout tournament, including a bronze medal race. Each race, in both the qualifying round and the knock-out rounds, consisted of two teams of 4 cyclists each starting from opposite sides of the track. The teams raced for 4,000 metres, attempting to finish with the fastest time (measured by the third rider) and, if possible, catch the other team. For the qualifying round, the eight fastest times overall (regardless of whether the team finished first or second in its heat, though any team that was overtaken was eliminated) earned advancement to the knockout rounds. In the knockout rounds, the winner of each heat advanced to the next round. Teams could change members between rounds.

Results

Qualifying round

Taiwan (heat 1) and Congo-Kinshasa (heat 2) had teams entered but did not compete.

Quarterfinals

Quarterfinal 1

Quarterfinal 2

Quarterfinal 3

Quarterfinal 4

Semifinals

Semifinal 1

Semifinal 2

Finals

Bronze medal match

Final

West Germany led throughout. At one point, Kissner's hand appeared to touch teammate Henrichs. East Germany (Henrichs was a defector) protested, resulting in West Germany's disqualification. It was initially announced that Italy and the Soviet Union would move up to silver and bronze medals, respectively, but West Germany protested and the judges determined that Italy would retain bronze and the Soviet Union would be in fourth place; however, the silver medal place was at least temporarily vacant. A decision of the FIAC later awarded West Germany the silver medals.

Final classification

References

Cycling at the 1968 Summer Olympics
Cycling at the Summer Olympics – Men's team pursuit
Track cycling at the 1968 Summer Olympics